Kossi may refer to:
 Kossi Province

it is also a name:
Kossi Agassa (Togo football player)
Heikki Kossi (The Autocrats)
Kossi Efoui (writer)